The northern golden bulbul (Hypsipetes longirostris) is a species of songbird in the family Pycnonotidae. It is endemic to Indonesia. Its natural habitat is subtropical or tropical moist lowland forests.

Taxonomy and systematics
The northern golden bulbul was originally classified in the genus Criniger, and has also been classified in the genus  Alophoixus. Alternative names for the northern golden bulbul include the golden bulbul and Sula golden bulbul. Until recently, it was considered conspecific with the Seram golden bulbul and the Buru golden bulbul.

Subspecies
Six subspecies are currently recognized by the IOC:
 Sangihe golden bulbul (H. l. platenae) - (Blasius, W, 1888): Originally described as a separate species in the genus Criniger and also by some authorities in the genera Alophoixus and Thapsinillas. Found on the Sangihe Islands 
 Togian golden bulbul (H. l. aurea) - (Walden, 1872): Originally described as a separate species in the genus Criniger and also by some authorities in the genera Alophoixus and Thapsinillas. Found on the Togian Islands
 Banggai golden bulbul (H. l. harterti) - (Stresemann, 1912): Classified as a separate species by some authorities. Found on the Banggai Islands
 Sula golden bulbul (H. l. longirostris) - (Wallace, 1863): Originally described as a separate species in the genus Criniger. Found on the Sula Islands
 Halmahera golden bulbul (H. l. chloris) - (Finsch, 1867): Originally described as a separate species in the genus Criniger and also by some authorities in the genera Alophoixus and Thapsinillas. Found on Morotai, Halmahera and the Bacan Islands	
 Obi golden bulbul ('H'. l. lucasi) - (Hartert, 1903): Classified as a separate species by some authorities in the genera Alophoixus and Thapsinillas. Found on the Obi Islands

Some authorities recognise some or all of these golden bulbul subspecies as full species. Birds of the World Online recognises five species, which they place in the genus Alophoixus, with A. l. harterti remaining as a subspecies of their A. longirostris.

References

Rheindt, F.E., and R.O. Hutchinson. 2007. A photoshot odyssey through the confused avian taxonomy of Seram and Buru (southern Moluccas). BirdingASIA 7: 18–38.

northern golden bulbul
Birds of Wallacea
northern golden bulbul